Ronald Capewell (26 July 1929 – 16 August 2016) was an English footballer who played in the Football League for Sheffield Wednesday and Hull City during the early 1950s. He also played non-league football for Kiveton Park and King's Lynn.

In the 1962–63 season he played seven times for Mossley.

References

External links
 Capewell playing against West Bromwich Albion on Saturday 27 December 1952 

1929 births
2016 deaths
Footballers from Sheffield
Association football goalkeepers
English footballers
Kiveton Park F.C. players
Sheffield Wednesday F.C. players
Hull City A.F.C. players
King's Lynn F.C. players
English Football League players
Mossley A.F.C. players